Svetlana Moskalets; born 22 January 1969) is a retired Russian heptathlete.

She finished fifth at the 1994 European Athletics Championships, won the gold medal at the 1995 World Indoor Championships, the silver medal at the 1995 World Championships and finished fourteenth at the 1996 Olympic Games. She also participated at the 1997 World Championships without finishing the competition.

Her personal best score was 6598 points, achieved in June 1994 in Vladimir.

See also
List of World Athletics Championships medalists (women)
List of IAAF World Indoor Championships medalists (women)

References

1969 births
Living people
People from Mytishchi
Sportspeople from Moscow Oblast
Russian heptathletes
Olympic heptathletes
Olympic athletes of Russia
Athletes (track and field) at the 1996 Summer Olympics
Goodwill Games medalists in athletics
Competitors at the 1994 Goodwill Games
World Athletics Championships athletes for Russia
World Athletics Championships medalists
World Athletics Indoor Championships winners
Russian Athletics Championships winners